Queen Jangryeol (장렬왕후 조씨; 16 December 1624 – 20 September 1688), of the Yangju Jo clan, was a posthumous name bestowed to the wife and second queen consort of Yi Jong, King Injo, the 16th Joseon monarch. She was queen consort of Joseon from 1638 until her husband's death in 1649, after which she was honoured as Queen Dowager Jaui (자의왕대비) during the reign of her step-son Yi Ho, King Hyojong, and as Grand Queen Dowager Jaui (자의대왕대비) during the reign of her step-grandson Yi Yeon, King Hyeonjong and her step-great-grandson Yi Sun, King Sukjong.

Biography
The future queen was born on 16 December 1624 during the reign King Injo. Her father, Jo Chang-won, was member of the Yangju Jo clan. Her mother was member of the Jeonju Choi clan.

Three years after his first wife Queen Inyeol's death, Injo selected the fourteen-year old daughter of Jo Chang-won as new queen consort in December 1638. The King was 44 years old, and his two sons, Crown Prince Sohyeon and Grand Prince Bongrim, were 12 and 5 years her senior.

The Queen's relationship with Injo was not good due to the fact that she could not bear a son, and because the King's concubine, Royal Consort Gwi-in of the Okcheon Jo clan, had succeeded in having Injo to hate her. Thus she left the main palace, Changdeok Palace, in 1645 to live in Gyeongdeok Palace (now known as Gyeonghui Palace). 

After Injo's death, she was elevated to the rank of queen dowager and formally addressed as Queen Dowager Jaui. Disputes happened during the death of her stepson, Hyojong, and his wife, Queen Inseon, where the factions argued on the duration in which Jaui would have to wear the mourning attire called sangbok. The incident was known as Yesong Dispute (예송논쟁): for Hyojong's funeral, it became an issue to determine whether the dowager should be mourning for three years or one year, while for Queen Dowager Hyosuk, either one year or nine months. 

When Hyeonjong became the king in 1659, Jaui officially became grand queen dowager. She led a solitary life until her death at the age of 64 on 20 December 1688 during Sukjong's reign after living 50 years of her life as a woman of the royal palace.

Her tomb is located in Hwineung, Donggurneung, which is located within the city of Guri in Gyeonggi Province.

Family  
Parent

 Father − Jo Chang-won (조창원, 趙昌遠) (1583 – 1646)
 1) Grandfather − Jo Jon-seong (조존성, 趙存性) (1553/54 – 1668)
 2) Great-Grandfather − Jo Nam (조남, 趙擥)
 1) Grandmother − Lady Yi of the Yongin Yi clan (증 정경부인 용인 이씨, 贈 貞敬夫人 龍仁 李氏)
 Uncle - Jo Gye-won (조계원, 趙啓遠)
 Aunt - Lady Shin of the Pyeongsan Shin clan (평산 신씨, 平山 申氏)
 Cousin - Jo Ga-seok (조가석, 趙嘉錫)
 Cousin - Jo Sa-seok (조사석, 趙師錫) (1632 – 1693)
 Cousin - Jo Hui-seok (조희석, 趙禧錫)
 Mother − Internal Princess Consort Wansan of the Jeonju Choi clan (완산부부인 전주 최씨, 完山府夫人 全州 崔氏) (1583 – 1663)
 1) Grandfather − Choi Cheol-geon (최철견, 崔鐡堅)
 1) Grandmother − Lady Jeong of the Jinyang Jeong clan (진양 정씨, 晉陽 鄭氏)

Sibling

 Older brother − Jo Yun-seok (조윤석, 趙胤錫) (1615 – 1664)
 Sister-in-law − Lady Kim of the (new) Andong Kim clan (신 안동 김씨, 新 安東 金氏); daughter of Kim Su-in (김수인, 金壽仁)
 Older sister − Jo Su-im (조수임, 趙壽任), Lady Jo of the Yangju Jo clan (양주 조씨, 楊州 趙氏)
 Brother-in-law − Shin Ik-jeon (신익전, 申翊全)
 Nephew − Shin Jeong (신정, 申晸)
 Nephew − Shin Seom (신섬, 申暹)
 Nephew − Shin Chang (신창)
 Nephew − Shin Yeob (신엽, 申曅)
 Nephew − Shin Ahng (신앙, 申昻)
 Niece − Lady Shin of the Pyeongsan Shin clan (평산 신씨)
 Nephew-in-law − Yi Hye (이혜, 李嵆); King Seonjo's great-grandson
 Niece − Princess Consort Yeongpung of the Pyeongsan Shin clan (영풍군부인 평산 신씨) (1639 – 1692)
 Nephew-in-law − Yi Jing, Prince Seungseon (이징 숭선군, 李澂 崇善君) (1639 – 1690)
 Niece − Lady Shin of the Pyeongsan Shin clan (평산 신씨)
 Older sister − Jo Jong-im (조종임, 趙終任), Lady Jo of the Yangju Jo clan (양주 조씨, 楊州 趙氏) 
 Brother-in-law − Han Jeong-sang (한정상, 韓鼎相)

Consort

 Yi Jong, King Injo (인조) (7 December 1595 – 17 June 1649) — No issue.
 Mother-in-law - Queen Inheon of the Neungseong Gu clan (17 April 1578 – 14 January 1626) (인헌왕후 구씨)
 Father-in-law - Wonjong of Joseon (2 August 1580 – 29 December 1619) (조선 원종)

Issue

 Adoptive son − Yi Wang, Crown Prince Sohyeon (소현세자 왕, 昭顯世子 汪) (5 February 1612 – 22 May 1645)
 Daughter-in-law − Crown Princess Consort Minhoe of the Geumcheon Kang clan (민회빈 강씨, 愍懷嬪 姜氏) (8 April 1611 – 30 April 1646)
 Unnamed adoptive granddaughter (군주, 郡主) (1629 – 1631)
 Unnamed adoptive granddaughter (군주, 郡主) (1631 – 1640)
 Grandson - Yi Seok-cheol, Prince Gyeongseon (경선군 석철, 慶善君 石鐵) (1636 – 1648)
 Adoptive granddaughter - Princess Gyeongsuk (경숙군주, 慶淑郡主) (1637 – 1655)
 Adoptive grandson - Yi Seok-rin, Prince Gyeongwan (경완군 석린, 慶完君 石磷) (1640 – 1648)
 Adoptive granddaughter - Princess Gyeongnyeong (경녕군주, 慶寧郡主) (1642 – 1682)
 Adoptive granddaughter - Yi Jeong-eun, Princess Gyeongsun (경순군주 정온, 慶順郡主 正溫) (1643 – 1654)
 Adoptive granddaughter - Yi Seok-gyeon, Prince Gyeongan (경안군 석견, 慶安君 石堅) (5 October 1644 – 22 October 1665)
 Adoptive son − King Hyojong (효종) (3 July 1619 – 23 June 1659)
 Daughter-in-law − Queen Inseon of the Deoksu Jang clan (인선왕후 장씨) (9 February 1619 – 19 March 1674)
 Adoptive granddaughter - Princess Sukshin (1635 – 1637) (숙신공주)
Adoptive granddaughter - Yi Ae-suk (이애숙, 李愛淑), Princess Uisun (1635 – 1662) (의순공주)
 Adoptive granddaughter - Princess Sukan (1636 – 22 December 1697) (숙안공주)
 Unnamed adoptive grandson (? – 1642)
 Adoptive granddaughter - Princess Sukmyeong (1640 – 17 March 1699) (숙명공주)
 Adoptive grandson - Yi Yeon, King Hyeonjong (14 March 1641 – 17 September 1674) (조선 현종)
 Adoptive granddaughter - Princess Sukhwi (1642 – 27 October 1696) (숙휘공주)
 Unnamed adoptive grandson (1645 – 1645)
 Adoptive granddaughter - Princess Sukjeong (1646 – 13 June 1668) (숙정공주)
 Adoptive granddaughter - Princess Sukgyeong (1648 – 9 January 1671) (숙경공주)

In popular culture
Portrayed by Kang Soo-yeon and Jo Eun-duk in the 1981 KBS1 TV Series Daemyeong.
 Portrayed by Jung Hye-sun in 1988 MBC TV series Queen Inhyeon.
 Portrayed by Kim Yeong-ae in 1995 SBS TV series Jang Hui-bin.
 Portrayed by Kang Bu-ja in the 2002 KBS2 TV series Jang Hee-bin.
 Portrayed by Go Won-hee in the 2013 JTBC TV series Blooded Palace: The War of Flowers.
 Portrayed by Lee Hyo-chun in the 2013 SBS TV series Jang Ok-jung, Living by Love.
 Portrayed by Chae Bin in the 2015 MBC TV series Splendid Politics.

References

Notes

17th-century Korean people
1624 births
1688 deaths
Royal consorts of the Joseon dynasty
Korean queens consort